Dreamfields may refer to:

 "Dreamfields" episode of Princess Gwenevere and the Jewel Riders
 Dreamfields brand of low-carb pasta
 The Dreamfields novel by K. W. Jeter